Francis Roger Groom (born 3 November 1936) is a former Australian politician. He was born in Hobart, Tasmania. In 1976, he was elected to the Tasmanian House of Assembly representing Braddon for the Liberal Party. He held his seat until his resignation in 1997, when he was replaced in a countback by Carole Cains.

References

1936 births
Living people
Liberal Party of Australia members of the Parliament of Tasmania
Members of the Tasmanian House of Assembly